Pakistan is the fifth most populous nation in the world. Below is a list of some notable people who relate to the country. See Pakistani people for a list of pages about notable Pakistanis by category.

Heads of state or government

Civil / democratically elected administrators
Muhammad Ali Jinnah, "Quaid-e-Azam"; first Governor General of Pakistan, and the main founder of Pakistan.
Liaquat Ali Khan
Khawaja Nazimuddin
Ghulam Muhammad
Iskander Mirza
Chaudhury Mohammad Ali
Chaudhry Fazal Ellahi
Muhammad Rafiq Tarar
Hussein Shaheed Suhrawardy
Muhammad Ali Bogra
Ibrahim Ismail Chundrigar
Feroz Khan Noon
Zulfikar Ali Bhutto
Muhammad Khan Junejo
Ghulam Ishaq Khan
Benazir Bhutto
Farooq Leghari
Ghulam Mustafa Jatoi
Balakh Sher Mazari
Moeen Qureshi
Malik Meraj Khalid
Zafarullah Khan Jamali
Chaudhry Shujaat Hussain
Shaukat Aziz
Wasim Sajjad
Mohammad Mian Soomro
Yousaf Raza Gillani
Raja Pervez Ashraf
Nawaz Sharif
Mamnoon Hussain
Arif Alvi 
Shahid Khaqan Abbasi
Asif Ali Zardari
Imran Khan
Shehbaz Sharif

Military / non-democratically elected administrators 
Field Marshal Ayub Khan 
General Agha Muhammed Yahya Khan
General Muhammad Zia-ul-Haq
General Pervez Musharraf

Foreign ministers 
Sir Chaudhry Muhammad Zafarullah Khan (27 December 1947—24 October 1954)
Aziz Ahmed (30 March 1977—5 July 1977)
Agha Shahi (14 January 1978—9 March 1982)
Sahabzada Yaqub Khan (21 March 1982—1 November 1987)
Abdul Sattar (23 July 1993—19 October 1993)
Sardar Asif Ahmad Ali (16 November 1993—4 November 1996)
Sahabzada Yaqub Khan (Caretaker: 11 November 1996—24 February 1997)
Gohar Ayub (25 February 1997—7 August 1998)
Sartaj Aziz
Abdul Sattar (23 July 1999—14 June 2002)
Khurshid Mahmud Kasuri (23 November 2002—15 November 2007)
Inam-ul-Haq (Caretaker: 15 November 2007—24 March 2008)
Shah Mehmood Qureshi (31 March 2008—February 2011)
Hina Rabbani Khar (18 July 2011—11 May 2013)
Shah Mehmood Qureshi (20 August 2018)
Khawaja Muhammad Asif
Nawaz Sharif
Bilawal Bhutto Zardari

Bureaucrats 
Roedad Khan
Sartaj Aziz
Nargis Sethi
Tariq Bajwa
Fazalur Rehman
Mohammed Ikramullah
Rizwan Ahmed
Tasneem Noorani
Usman Ali Isani
Qudrat Ullah Shahab
Syed Abu Ahmad Akif
Jawad Rafique Malik
Sikandar Sultan Raja
Nasir Mahmood Khosa
Rabiya Javeri Agha
Fawad Hassan Fawad
Kamran Lashari

Diplomats
A. S. Bokhari
Agha Shahi
Jamsheed Marker
Jauhar Saleem
Javid Husain
Maliha Lodhi
Prince Ali Khan
Khalid Amir Khan, Ambassador to Hungary, Uzbekistan and Tajikistan
Riaz Khokhar
Najmuddin Sheikh
Tehmina Janjua
Tariq Azim Khan, High Commissioner to Canada (from 2015 to 2018)
Abdus Salim Khan
Shahryar Khan

Attorney General of Pakistan
 Aziz A Munshi
 Makhdoom Ali Khan
 Malik Mohammad Qayyum 
 Latif Khosa
 Ashtar Ausaf Ali
 Salman Aslam Butt
 Khalid Jawed Khan
 Iqbal Haider

Other major political figures
Fatima Jinnah, sister of Quaid-e-Azam Muhammad Ali Jinnah
Chaudhry Rehmat Ali, coined the word "Pakistan"
Allama Ghulam Ahmed Pervez, Tahreek-e- Pakistan activist, associate of the Quaid-e-Azam and a scholar on the Quran
Allama Mashriqi
Ghulam Muhammad Khan Bhurgri
Abul A'la Maududi, writer of Tafhim-ul-Quran, founder of Jamaat-e-Islami Pakistan
Anwar Kamal Khan, senior leader of political party PMLN
Syed Ata Ullah Shah Bukhari, leader of Majlis-e-Ahrar-e-Islam
Mahmud Ali, leader in the Pakistan Movement, statesman and journalist
Sikandar Hayat Khan, Premier of the Province of Punjab and senior statesman
Sahib of Manki Sharif
Chaudhry Afzal Haq
Sardar Abdur Rab Nishtar
Bahadur Yar Jung
Master Taj-ud-Din Ansari
Sheikh Hissam-ud-Din
Chaudhry Khaliquzzaman
Agha Shorish Kashmiri
Khan Abdul Ghaffar Khan
Maulana Mohammad Ali
Mushtaq Ahmad Gurmani
Nawabzada Nasrullah Khan, Ahrari leader
Chaudhry Zahoor Elahi 
Shahzada Mohiuddin 
Ghulam Faruque Khan
Qazi Hussain Ahmed, ex-Chairman of Jamaat-e-Islami Pakistan
Imran Khan, ex-cricket player, former prime minister in Pakistan
Mufti Mahmud, founding member of Jamiat Ulema-e-Islam and former Chief Minister of Khyber Pakhtunkhwa
Naseer Khan Khoso
Shabbir Ahmad Usmani, founder of Jamiat Ulama-e-Islam.
Benazir Bhutto

Judges
Justice A. R. Cornelius
Justice Abdul Hameed Dogar
Justice Sir Abdur Rashid
Justice S. Anwarul Haq
Justice Dorab Patel
Justice Fakhruddin G. Ebrahim
Justice Hamoodur Rahman
Justice Ajmal Mian
Justice Saeeduzzaman Siddiqui
Justice Iftikhar Muhammad Chaudhry
Justice Mohammad Haleem
Justice Muhammad Afzal Zullah
Justice Muhammad Munir
Justice Muhammad Rustum Kiani
Justice Muhammad Shahabuddin
Justice Muhammad Yaqub Ali
Justice Dr. Nasim Hasan Shah
Justice Qadeeruddin Ahmed
Justice Rana Bhagwandas
Justice Sajjad Ali Shah
Justice Mukhtiar Ahmad Junejo
Justice Chaudhry Muhammad Sharif
Justice Wajihuddin Ahmed
Justice Haziqul Khairi
Justice Zafar Hussain Mirza
Justice Saqib Nisar
Justice Asif Saeed Khosa
Justice Allama Khalid Mahmood
Justice Gulzar Ahmed
Justice Athar Minallah
Justice Ali Baqar Najafi
Justice Zahid Hussain

Lawyers

Imtiaz Rashid Qureshi, founder of Bhagat Singh Memorial Foundation of Pakistan
S M Zafar 
Akhtar Aly Kureshy
Hamid Khan 
Asma Jahangir, Senior ASC
Aitzaz Ahsan
Ashtar Ausaf Ali 
Khalid Ranjha 
Abdul Hafeez Pirzada
Mahmud Ali Kasuri
Ahmad Awais
Wasim Sajjad
Ghulam Farooq Awan
Mirza Aziz Akbar Baig
Syed Sharifuddin Pirzada
Sahibzada Ahmed Raza Khan Kasuri
Akram Sheikh
Syed Ali Zafar
Naseer Ahmed Bhutta
Babar Awan
Rana Muhammad Akram Khan
Makhdoom Ali Khan
Khalid Anwer
Mohammed Jibran Nasir
Abid Hassan Minto
Shakeel ur Rahman
Abdul Ghafoor Bhurgri
Farooq Naek
Salman Aslam Butt
Suman Kumari, first Hindu woman judge in Pakistan
Asrar-ul-Haq Mian
Iqbal Haider
Hina Jilani

Human rights activists and philanthropists
Abdul Sattar Edhi, founder of Edhi Foundation
Ruth Pfau, founder of Marie Adelaide Leprosy Centre
Ramzan Chhipa, founder of Chhipa Welfare Association
Hakim Muhammad Saeed, founder of Hamdard Pakistan
Ansar Burney, founder of Ansar Burney Trust International
Dr. Amjad Saqib, founder of Akhuwat Foundation
Naimatullah Khan, advocate, former Chairman of Al-Khidmat Foundation
Imtiaz Rashid Qureshi, founder of Bhagat Singh Memorial Foundation of Pakistan
Irfan Pardesi, founder and President of Zee Foundation
Mushtaq Chhapra, founder of The Citizens Foundation
Sheema Kermani, founder of Tehrik-e-Niswan
Asma Jahangir
Hina Jilani 
Abid Qaiyum Suleri
Shoaib Sultan Khan
Masood Ul Mulk
Fatima Lodhi
Begum Mahmooda Salim Khan, first woman minister in Pakistan and prominent social worker
Veeru Kohli
 Dadi Leela (1916–2017), educationist, music teacher, philanthropist
Gulalai Ismail
Syeda Ghulam Fatima
Fouzia Saeed
Tabassum Adnan

Academia

Scientists, researchers and scholars
Abdus Salam, Nobel laureate in physics 1979, science advisor to the Government of Pakistan (1960–1974), founding director of Space and Upper Atmosphere Research Commission (SUPARCO), received the Sitara-e-Pakistan for contribution to science in Pakistan (1959) and founded the International Center for Theoretical Physics in Trieste
Ahmad Hasan Dani, Distinguished National Professor and Professor Emeritus, Quaid-e-Azam University; historian and archaeologist
Tariq Rahman, linguistic historian, HEC Distinguished National Professor and Emeritus Professor, Quaid-e-Azam University, Islamabad, Pakistan
Ishtiaq Hussain Qureshi, scholar, critic, Vice Chancellor, University of Karachi, Karachi, Pakistan
Pirzada Qasim, scholar, Vice Chancellor, University of Karachi, Karachi
Attash Durrani, scholar, linguist, Director, Center of Excellence for Urdu Informatics, Islamabad, Pakistan
Atta ur Rahman
Alamgir Hashmi, literary scholar, historian, critic, translator
Chaudhry Faisal Mushtaq, chief executive officer (CEO) of Roots Millennium Schools, executive director of Roots School System, recipient of ‘Tamgha-e-Imtiaz’
Abdul Qadeer Khan, nuclear physicist
Munir Ahmad Khan, nuclear physicist, former Chairman of the Pakistan Atomic Energy Commission (PAEC), 1972–1991, chairman, IAEA Board of Governors, 1986–87
Ishfaq Ahmad, nuclear physicist and former Chairman of the PAEC
Abdullah Sadiq, nuclear physicist and AS-ICTP laureate
Samar Mubarakmand, nuclear physicist, Chairman of the National Engineering and Scientific Commission (NESCOM)
Anwar Ali, former Chairman of the PAEC
Shahid Hussain Bokhari, computer and aerospace engineer
Salimuzzaman Siddiqui, PhD in organic chemistry
Pervez Hoodbhoy, nuclear physicist
Javaid Laghari, aerospace engineer, former Chairman of Higher Education Commission (HEC) of Pakistan
Datuk Rahman Anwar Syed, entomologist responsible for discovering the biological method of oil palm pollination
Anwar Naseem, Advisor Science COMSTECH, Chairman National Commission on Biotechnology Pakistan, founding president of FABA
Atta ur Rahman, PhD in organic chemistry, awarded a Doctorate of Science by the University of Cambridge in 1987
Ismat Beg, mathematician, PhD University of Bucharest, 1982
Umar Saif, computer engineer, PhD University of Cambridge, 2001
Syed Waqar Jaffry, Computer Scientist, Academician, PhD in Artificial Intelligence, Vrije Universitiet, Amsterdam.
Ayub K. Ommaya, professor of neurosurgery at the Royal College of Surgeons of England; expert in traumatic brain injuries; inventor of the Ommaya reservoir, which is used to provide chemotherapy directly to brain tumors
Abdul Jamil Khan, Principal of Ayub Medical College, Bolan Medical College, Frontier Medical College, Former Minister of Population
Hasnat Khan, heart surgeon, head of Pakistan Institute of Medical Sciences; also worked in Chelsea, London
Arif Alvi, Chairman of Pakistan Dental Federation
Roger H. Armour, inventor of the hand-held ophthalmoscope
Sania Nishtar, cardiologist, health policy expert and minister
Muhammed Suhail Zubairy, professor in the Department of Physics and Astronomy at the Texas A&M University, USl;holder of Munnerlyn-Heep Chair in Quantum Optics
A G N Kazi
Mirza Muzaffar Ahmad (1913–2002), executive director of the World Bank for Pakistan and the Middle East
Mohammad Zubair Khan
Abdul-Majid Bhurgri, hero of Sindhi computing
Ahmed Hussain A. Kazi, former Chairman of Pakistan Industrial Development Corporation 
Ghulam Faruque Khan
Hafeez A. Pasha
Mahbub ul Haq, economist and co-creator of the Human Development Index (HDI)
Ishrat Hussain
Salman Shah
Syed Nawab Haider Naqvi
Dr. Ziaul Haque
Asad Umar
Akhtar Hameed Khan
Matin Ahmed Khan, marketing expert and management educator
Bernadette Louise Dean, former Principal of Kinnaird College for Women
Mary Emily Gonsalves, Sitara-e-Imtiaz
Bhawani Shankar Chowdhry
Jacqueline Maria Dias
Rubina Gillani
Dr. Nergis Mavalvala, Kathleen Marble Professor of Astrophysics at the Massachusetts Institute of Technology (MIT), and 2010 MacArthur Fellow; part of the team that made the first direct gravitational wave observation
Adil Najam, founding Dean of the Frederick S. Pardee School of Global Studies at Boston University; former Vice Chancellor of the Lahore University of Management Sciences (LUMS)
Prop. Dr. Ihsan Ali Sitara-i-Imtiaz Vice-Chancellor of Abdul Wali Khan University Mardan
Sardar Mohammad Khan, scholar of linguistics
Zulfiqar Bhutta
Anita Zaidi
Asghar Zaidi 
Eqbal Ahmed , political scientist, writer and academic known for his anti-war activism, his support for resistance movements globally and academic contributions to the study of Near East
Dr.Khalid Manzoor Butt, educationist and scholar, Dean of Political Science Department GCU
Hakim Syed Ali Ahmad Nayyar Wasty, scholar (history of medicine)
Amer Iqbal, Pakistani American theoretical physicist. He is primarily known for his work in string theory and mathematical physics
Syed Hamid Nawab, Professor of Electrical and Computer and Biomedical Engineering, Boston University;   co-author of widely used textbook Signals and Systems (1997), published by Prentice Hall (Pearson); researcher in signal processing and machine perception with application to auditory, speech, and neuromuscular systems

School teachers
Oswald Bruno Nazareth
Zinia Pinto
Norma Fernandes, Tamgha-i-Imtiaz
Yolande Henderson
Salima Begum

Religious scholars
 Muhammad Shafi Deobandi, former Grand Mufti of Pakistan.
 Allama Khadim Hussain Rizvi, Islamic Scholar, Founder of TLP
Molana Tariq Jamil, religious leader and member of Tablighi Jamaat
Mufti Rafi Usmani, President of Darul Uloom Karachi
Syed Adnan Kakakhail, Mufti, Muslim Scholar, Founder and CEO of Al-Burhan Institute
Muhammad Muneeb-ur-Rehman, Mufti, Chairman of Ruet-e-Hilal Committee
Saqib Raza Mustafai, founder of Idara-tul-Mustafa
Muhammad Ilyas Qadri, Ameer e Dawat-e-Islami, co-founder of Dawat-e-Islami
Muhammad Raza Saqib Mustafai, founder of Idara-tul-Mustafa
Israr Ahmed, religious leader and the founder of Tanzeem-e-Islami
Muhammad Hussain Najafi, religious leader
Allama Hussain Bakhsh Jarra, religious leader
Javed Ahmed Ghamidi, religious scholar, Al-Mawrid International, Pakistan
Mufti Jafar Hussain, religious leader
Talib Jauhari, Islamic scholar, religious leader, public speaker, Qur'anic interpreter, Urdu poet, historian and philosopher
Syed Munawar Hasan, former Chairman of the Jamaat-e-Islami Pakistan
Muhammad Tahir-ul-Qadri, law professor, Sufi Islamic scholar and founder of Minhaj-ul-Quran 
Maulana Muhammad Shafee Okarvi, religious scholar, founder of Jamaa'at-e-Ahle Sunnat
Ghulam Ahmed Pervez, religious Quranic scholar, founder of Talu-e-Islam
Farhat Hashmi, founder of Al-Huda International
Syed Ata Ullah Shah Bukhari, Ameer-e-Shariat
Amin Ahsan Islahi
Allamah Rasheed Turabi
Ayesha Jalal, religious leader and scholar
Ishtiaq Hussain Qureshi, historian
Khurshid Ahmad, scholar, Vice President of the Jamaat-e-Pakistan
Muzaffar Iqbal
Ehsan Elahi Zaheer Islamic scholar, author and founder of the Jamiat-E-Ahlihadees in Pakistan
Muhammad Taqi Usmani
Khurram Zaki, scholar and journalist
Zafar Ishaq Ansari, Director General, Islamic Research Institute, International Islamic University, Islamabad 
Zubair Ali Zai
Moeen Nizami

Military personnel

Major Tufail Muhammad Shaheed (1914 – August 7, 1958), Nishan-E-Haider
Major Aziz Bhatti Shaheed, Nishan-E-Haider
Major Muhammad Akram Shaheed (1938–1971), Nishan-E-Haider
Pilot Officer Rashid Minhas Shaheed (1951 – August 20, 1971), Nishan-E-Haider
Major Shabbir Sharif Shaheed (1943 – December 6, 1971), Nishan-E-Haider
Sawar Muhammad Hussain Shaheed (1949 – December 10, 1971), Nishan-E-Haider
Lance Naik Muhammad Mahfuz Shaheed (1944 – December 17, 1971), Nishan-E-Haider
Captain Karnal Sher Khan Shaheed (1970 – July 5, 1999), Nishan-E-Haider
Lalak Jan Shaheed (1967 – July 7, 1999), Nishan-E-Haider
Major Malik Munawar Khan Awan (died May 1981), Sitara-e-Jurat, 1965 war hero who captured Area Rajouri, Budhil and Mehdar from India during Operation Gibraltar
General Muhammad Musa Khan Hazara, 4th Army Commander-in-Chief, 4th Governor of West Pakistan and 10th Governor of Balochistan
General Sawar Khan, former Vice Chief of Army Staff
General Iftikhar Janjua, Hilal-e-Jurat, 1971 war hero of Rann of Kutch operations
General Muhammad Shariff, former Chairman of the Joint Chiefs of Staff Committee (CJCSC) 1977
General Iqbal Khan, former Chairman of the Joint Chiefs of Staff Committee (CJCSC) 1980–1984
General Zafar H. Naqvi, Army Air Defence Commander
General Mirza Aslam Beg, former Chief of Army Staff (COAS), think tank head
General Asif Nawaz Janjua, former Chief of Army Staff (COAS)
General Abdul Waheed Kakar, former Chief of Army Staff (COAS)
General Jehangir Karamat former Chief of Army Staff (COAS), Ambassador to the United States
General Rahimuddin Khan, 7 year Martial Law Governor of Balochistan and provincial hero
General Ashfaq Parvez Kayani, former Chief of Army Staff (COAS) & Chairman Joint Chiefs of Staff Committee (CJCSC)
General Raheel Sharif, former Chief of Army Staff (COAS), Commander-in-Chief of the Islamic Military Counter Terrorism Coalition
General Qamar Javed Bajwa, Chief of Army Staff (COAS)
General Nadeem Raza, Chairman Joint Chiefs of Staff Committee (CJCSC)
Admiral Shahid Karimullah
Admiral Tariq Kamal Khan
Lieutenant General, Akhtar Hussain Malik (died August 22, 1969), Hilal-i-Jurat, 1965 war hero
Lieutenant General, Abdul Ali Malik, 1965 war hero for his role in the Battle of Chawinda
Lieutenant General Ahmad Shuja Pasha, former DG ISI
Lieutenant General Zaheer-ul-Islam, former DG ISI
Lieutenant General Rizwan Akhtar, former DG ISI
Lieutenant General Naveed Mukhtar, former DG ISI
Lieutenant General Asim Saleem Bajwa, former DG ISPR & Commander southern command, Chairman CPEC Authority
Lieutenant General Syed Asim Munir Ahmed Shah, former DG ISI, Commander XXX Corps (Pakistan)
Lieutenant General Faiz Hameed, DG ISI
Vice Admiral Syed Mohammad Ahsan, former Governor of East Pakistan
Air Vice Marshall Eric Gordon Hall
Major General Athar Abbas former DG ISPR, Ambassador to Ukraine
Major General Julian Peter
Major General Noel Israel Khokhar
Major General Asif Ghafoor, former DG ISPR, GOC Okara 40th Infantry Division
Major General Babar Iftikhar, DG ISPR
Rear Admiral Leslie Mungavin
Brigadier Samson Simon Sharaf
Brigadier Mervyn Cardoza
Brigadier Daniel Austin
Air Vice Marshall (R) Farooq Umar
Air Commodore Nazir Latif
Air Commodore (R) Muhammad Mehmood Alam (M M Alam)
Group Captain Cecil Chaudhry
Wing Commander Mervyn Middlecoat
Squadron Leader Peter Christy
Squadron Leader Sarfraz Rafiqui
Captain Hercharn Singh
Rahul Dev, first person from the Hindu community to recruited in the Pakistan Air Force

Businesspeople and industrialists
Abdul Razaq Dawood, founder of Descon
Abdul Razzak Yaqoob, Chairman of the ARY Group
Bashir Ali Mohammad, Gul Ahmed Group
Byram Avari, Chairman of the Avari Group
Chaudhry Ahmed Saeed, Chairman of the Servis Group, former managing director in and Chairman of the Pakistan International Airlines Corporation (PIAC)
Fiza Farhan, co-founder of Buksh Foundation
Huma Batool, first woman to own a Pakistan-based scheduled airline
Iqbal Ali Lakhani, Lakson Group
Jahangir Khan Tareen, owner of sugar mills
Jahangir Siddiqui, owner of JS Group
Malik Riaz, Pakistani business tycoon who is the founder of Bahria Town
Mian Amir Mahmood, Pakistani politician and founder of the Punjab Group of Colleges
Mian Muhammad Latif, Chenab Group, ChenOne
Mian Muhammad Mansha, industrialist and businessman
Mir Shakil ur Rehman, Jang Group
Sadruddin Hashwani, founder and chairman of Hashoo Group
Shiza Shahid, co-founder of Malala Fund
Shahid Khan, owner of automobile parts manufacturer Flex-N-Gate Corp, in Urbana, Illinois; owner of the NFL team Jacksonville Jaguars
Sikandar Sultan, managing director of Shan Food Industries
Syed Babar Ali, former caretaker Finance Minister of Pakistan, founder of Packages Limited, Milkpak Limited–now Nestlé Pakistan and Lahore University of Management Sciences

Bankers
Agha Hasan Abedi
Ishrat Husain
Moeenuddin Ahmad Qureshi
Muhammad Mian Soomro
Shahid Javed Burki
Shamshad Akhtar
Zahid Hussain
Shaukat Aziz, banker and former Prime Minister
Mian Muhammad Mansha
Mir Mohammad Ali Khan, Pakistani investment banker

Arts, literature and other media personalities

Writers and poets

Syed Imtiaz Ali Taj
Faiz Ahmed Faiz
Rasul Bux Palejo
Syed Sibte Hassan
Saadat Hassan Manto
Khawar Rizvi
Patras Bokhari
Ibn-e-Insha
Syed Irfan Ali Shah
Chaudhry Afzal Haq
Mohsin Naqvi
Agha Shorish Kashmiri
Janbaz Mirza
Abdullah Hussain
Ahmad Faraz
Shaikh Ayaz
Amar Jaleel
Sohail Sangi
Anwar Pirzada
Ahmad Nadeem Qasmi
Afrasiab Khattak
Alamgir Hashmi
Qalandar Momand
Siddiq Ismail
Anwer Maqsood
Ashfaq Ahmad
Bano Qudsia
Daud Kamal
Fatima Surayya Bajia
Ghulam Abbas
Habib Jalib
Hakim Ahmad Shuja
Hakim Said
Ibn-e-Insha
Ibn-e-Safi
Idris Azad
Ishtiaq Ahmad
Iftikhar Arif
Ihsan Danish
Jon Elia
Kazi Zainul Abedin
Khurshid Rizvi
Majeed Amjad
Mazhar Kaleem
Mohsin Hamid
Mohammed Hanif
Mustansar Hussain Tarar
Noon Meem Danish
Noon Meem Rashid
Obaidullah Aleem
Mirza Ather Baig
Parveen Shakir
Qateel Shafai
Raees Warsi
Saadat Hasan Manto
Sufi Ghulam Mustafa Tabassum
Vazir Agha
Wasif Ali Wasif
Zaib-un-Nissa Hamidullah
Zamir Jafri
Ahmad Nadeem Qasmi
Amjad Islam Amjad
Anwar Masood
Moeen Nizami
Fatima Bhutto
Abdur Rauf Urooj (c. 1932–1990)
Mohiuddin Nawab

Actors and actresses 
 For a categorical listing of actors in film, see :Category:Pakistani film actors
Adeeb, actor
Adil Murad, actor
Afzal Khan, actor
Ajab Gul, actor
Anjuman, actress
Ayesha Sana, actress
Aamina Sheikh, actress 
Babar Ali, actor
Babra Sharif, actress
Badar Munir, actor
Darpan, actor
Deeba, actor
Faysal Qureshi, actor
Fawad Khan, actor
Hamza Ali Abbasi, actor
Hareem Farooq, actress 
Humayun Saeed, actor
Husna, actress
Imran Abbas, actor
Inayat Hussain Bhatti, actor
Ismat Zaidi, actress
Ismael Shah, actor
Javed Sheikh, actor
Kamal Irani, actor
Mahira Khan, actress
Marina Khan, actress
Maya Ali
Mohib Mirza, actor
Meera, actress
Mehmood Aslam, actor
Mohammad Ali, actor
Moin Akhter, actor
Munawar Zarif, actor
Mustafa Qureshi, actor
Nadeem Baig, actor
Nadia Khan, actress
Naeem Hashmi, actor
Kamal Irani, actor
Nasira Zuberi, actress
Neelo, actress
Rahat Kazmi, actor
Saba Qamar, actress
Sabiha Khanum, actress
Saeed Khan Rangeela, actor
Saima, actress
Sami Khan, actor
Samina Pirzada, actress
Sana Nawaz, actress
Sangeeta, actor
Shaan Shahid, actor
Shafi Muhammad Shah, actor
Shahid, actor
Shamim Ara, actress
Sohail Ahmad, actor
Somy Ali, actress
Sultan Rahi, actor
Talat Husain, actor
Talish, actor
Tariq Aziz, actor
Waheed Murad, actor
Yousaf Khan, actor
Zahid Ahmed (actor)
Zeba, actress
Amanullah Khan (actor)

Artists and painters

Abdur Rahman Chughtai
Ahmed Saeed Nagi
Ajaz Anwar
Anna Molka Ahmed
A. R. Nagori
Asim Butt
Allah Bakhsh (painter)
Bashir Mirza
Huma Mulji
Ijaz ul Hassan
Eqbal Mehdi
Ismail Gulgee
Jamil Naqsh
Laraib Atta
Lubna Agha
Moeen Faruqi
Rashid Rana
Sadequain
Saira Wasim
Sara Shakeel
Shahid Mahmood
Shakir Ali
Saeed Akhtar
Hanif Ramay
Shazia Sikander
Suhail Ahmad
Zahoor ul Akhlaq
Zubeida Agha
Iqbal Hussain
Khalid Iqbal

Photographers
Farah Mahbub
Huma Mulji
Zaigham Zaidi
Tapu Javeri
Sarfaraz K. Niazi

Film and TV directors and documentary filmmakers
Aehsun Talish
Anwar Kamal Pasha 
Farooq Rind
Kashif Nisar
Khwaja Khurshid Anwar
Nazar-ul-Islam
Riaz Shahid
Sharmeen Obaid-Chinoy
Sabiha Sumar
Sarmad Sultan Khoosat
Shoaib Mansoor
Usman Peerzada
Yawar Hayat Khan

Visual effects 
Muqeem Khan
Laraib Atta

Fashion designers
Amir Adnan
Deepak Perwani
Hassan Sheheryar Yasin
Junaid Jamshed
Kamiar Rokni
Omar Mansoor

Models

Aminah Haq
Humaima Malick
Iffat Rahim
Iman Ali
Imran Abbas
Mehreen Raheel
Reema Khan
Tooba Siddiqui
Vaneeza Ahmad
Zara Sheikh
Ayaan Ali

Journalists

Agha Shorish Kashmiri
Janbaz Mirza
Ansar Abbasi
Ahmad Faruqui
Ahmed Rashid
Ardeshir Cowasjee, columnist and businessman
Arman Sabir, journalist working for BBC; earlier he was associated with DAWN for several years
Asghar Ali Engineer
Hassan Nisar
Hameed Nizami
Imran Aslam
Irfan Husain, columnist
Javed Malik, journalist, working for ARY
Kamal Siddiqi
Kamran Khan, Geo TV
Khalid Hasan
Maliha Lodhi
Mazhar Ali Khan, journalist, editor and publisher
Mehmood Sham, columnist
Mishal Hussain
Muhammad Farooq
Murtaza Razvi
Nadeem Malik
PJ Mir, journalist working for ARY
Shahid Javed Burki
Shahid Mahmood, journalist working for ARY
Dr.Shahid Masood, journalist, ex-Chairman of Pakistan Television Corporation (PTV)
Sohail Warraich, anchor on Geo TV
Surendar Valasai 
Syed Saleem Shahzad
Tahir Mirza
Talat Hussain, journalist working for AAJ TV
Zamir Niazi
Ian Fyfe, DAWN sports reporter
Khurram Zaki, journalist and TV host
 Abdullah Malik (1920–2003), journalist, writer

Musicians 

Abida Parveen
Amjad Sabri, Qawwal and Naat Khawan
Aaroh
Abrar-ul-Haq
Atif Aslam
Ali Azmat
Alam Lohar and Arif Lohar
Ahmed Rushdi, film song singer
Ali Zafar
Amanat Ali Khan, ghazal singer
Amjad Bobby, film music composer
Atif Aslam
Attaullah Khan Esakhelvi
Bade Ghulam Ali Khan, ghazal singer
Bohemia, rapper and music producer
Hadiqa Kiyani
Hamid Ali Khan, ghazal singer
Imran Khan, Punjabi singer
Khawaja Khurshid Anwar, film music composer
Mehdi Hassan, film singer
Masood Rana, film singer
Mustafa Zahid
Nadia Ali, singer
Naser Mestarihi, hard rock musician
Naseebo Lal, film singer
Nashad, film music composer
Nisar Bazmi, film music composer
Noor Jehan
Noori
Nusrat Fateh Ali Khan
Robin Ghosh, film music composer
Rahat Fateh Ali Khan
Rahim Shah
Rohail Hyatt
Sabri Brothers, qawwali musicians
Sahir Ali Bagga
Sajjad Ali
Shamim Nazli
Shehzad Roy
Salman Ahmad
Sohail Rana, film music composer
Sheraz Uppal
Waqar Ali
Zeb and Haniya
Alamgir, pop music singer
Ali Haider (singer)
Fakhir
Farida Khanum
Hadiqa Kiani
Jawad Ahmed
Junaid Jamshed
Jassi Lailpuria
Malika Pukhraj
Najam Sheraz
Nazia Hasan, pop singer
Zohaib Hasan
Tina Sani
S. B. John
Jassi Lailpuria
Ahmad Raza Khan
Siddiq Ismail
Khursheed Ahmad

Video jockeys 
Anoushey Ashraf
Ayesha Omar
Mahira Khan

Architects  
Kausar Bashir Ahmed
Nayyar Ali Dada
Habib Fida Ali 
Abdur Rahman Hye
Yasmeen Lari 
Umar Farooq 
Nasreddin Murat-Khan

YouTubers 

Amna Riaz
Mooroo
Muhammad Ali Mirza
Qasim Ali Shah

Sports

Squash
Jansher Khan, 8 time world open champion, 4 time super series champion, 6 time British champion
Aamir Atlas Khan
Farhan Mehboob
Hashim Khan, 8 time British champion
Jahangir Khan, 6 time world champion, 10 time British champion
Carla Khan
Mansoor Zaman
Qamar Zaman, British champion
Zaheer Abbas, legendary cricketeer

Athletics
John Permal, sprinter
Kamal Salman Masud, swimmer
Lianna Swan, swimmer
Kiran Khan, swimmer

Boxing
Muhammad Waseem, WBC Silver Flyweight Champion
Amir Khan, undisputed light-welterweight world champion
Hussain Shah
 Jan Mohammad Baloch  (1950-2012), Pakistani former olympian boxer, coach

Cricket

Imran Khan
Anil Dalpat
Imam-ul-Haq
Salman Butt
Asif Ali (cricketer, born 1989)
Asif Ali (cricketer, born 1991)
Shaheen Afridi
Nasir Jamshed
Javed Miandad
Abdul Hafeez Kardar
Mohammad Hafeez
Abdul Qadir
Abdul Razzaq
Aamer Sohail
Danish Kaneria
Fazal Mahmood
Faisal Iqbal
Fawad Alam
Hanif Mohammad
Imran Abbas
Imran Nazir
Inzamam-ul-Haq
Javed Burki
Junaid Khan
Kamran Akmal
Khan Mohammad
Majid Khan
Misbah-ul-Haq
Mohammad Amir
Mohammad Asif
Mohammad Yousuf 
Moin Khan
Mushtaq Ahmed
Rashid Latif
Saeed Ajmal
Saeed Anwar
Saqlain Mushtaq
Sarfraz Ahmed
Sarfraz Nawaz
Sajjida Shah 
Shahid Afridi
Sohail Tanvir
Shahid Khan Afridi
Shoaib Akhtar
Shoaib Malik
Umar Akmal
Umar Gul
Waqar Younis
Wasim Akram
Yasir Hameed
Yasir Shah
Younis Khan
Zaheer Abbas
Zahid Ahmed (cricketer)
Zahid Fazal
Babar Azam
Fakhar Zaman

E-sports 
Syed Sumail Hassan

Field hockey

Hassan Sardar
Samiullah
Shahbaz Ahmad
Shahid Ali Khan
Sohail Abbas
Tahir Zaman
Samiullah Khan
Basit Ali
Mohammad Zahid
Shahnaz Sheikh
Islahuddin
Jack Britto
Imran Mayo
Mahmood-ul Hassan

Golf
Taimur Hussain

Sailing
Munir Sadiq

Snooker
Khurram Hussain Agha
Mohammed Yousuf
Naveen Perwani
Saleh Mohammed
Muhammad Asif

Tennis
Aisam-ul-Haq Qureshi
Haroon Rahim

Football
Lt Col. (R) Younus Changezi, former member of national football team
Muhammad Essa, striker of the national football team
Kaleemullah Khan, striker of the national football team; currently playing Sacramento Republic FC
Jaffar Khan, legendary goalkeeper
Michael Masih, Kashmiri footballer

Mountaineers
Ashraf Aman
Nazir Sabir
Hassan Sadpara
Meherban Karim
Samina Baig
Amir Mehdi
 Abdul Jabbar Bhatti

Skiing
Amina Wali

Mixed martial arts
Bashir Ahmad

Police officers
Chaudhry Aslam Khan
Malik Saad
Allah Dino Khawaja
Nasir Durrani
Moazzam Jah Ansari
Pushpa Kumari Kohli, first Hindu woman police officer in Pakistan

Militants
Abdul Rauf Azhar
Ajmal Kasab, 2008 Mumbai terrorist attack
Fazlullah
Ghazi Baba, mastermind of 2001 Delhi parliament attack
Hafiz Saeed, mastermind of 2008 Mumbai terrorist attack
Hakimullah Mehsud
Ilyas Kashmiri, Al Qaeda operative
Khalid Sheikh Mohammed, architect of 9/11 
Malik Ishaq
Masood Azhar
Qari Hussain
Ramzi Yousef, convict in world trade centre bombing
Rashid Rauf
Riaz Basra
Sufi Muhammad
Wali-ur-Rehman
Zakiur Rehman Lakhvi

Other
Abdul Sattar Edhi, social worker
Aitzaz Hasan, schoolboy who died blocking a suicide bomber
Arfa Karim, computer prodigy
Malala Yousafzai, education activist
Zubeida Habib Rahimtoola, women's rights activist
Tooba Syed, feminist, political worker
Abdus Salam, Nobel Laureate

References

External links